Arbelodes claudiae is a moth in the family Cossidae. It is found in northern Malawi and north-eastern Zambia. The habitat consists of Juniperus forests and legume-dominated miombo.

The length of the forewings is about 11 mm for males and 14 mm for females. The forewings of the males are old gold, the costal margin and termen covered with spots and lunules of old gold edged with pure white. The hindwings are pale smoke grey, but white towards the base. The forewings of the females are glossy pale olive-buff, mixed with light brownish-olive scales. The hindwings are glossy light brownish olive.

Etymology
The species is named for Dr Claudia Meyer.

References

Natural History Museum Lepidoptera generic names catalog

Moths described in 2010
Metarbelinae